Adventures of the Gummi Bears is an American animated television series. The series aired on Saturday mornings on NBC from 1985 to 1989. It moved to ABC in the fall of 1989, where it aired as part of The Gummi Bears/Winnie the Pooh Hour until January 1990. In the fall of 1990, the series became a part of Disney's weekday afternoon syndicated cartoon block, The Disney Afternoon. Season 6 premiered as part of The Disney Afternoon, with new episodes interspersed with reruns of previous ones. In total, there are 95 individual 11-minute and 22-minute episodes, which make up 65 half hours.

Series overview

Episodes

Background
Seasons 1–5 are listed here in their original U.S. network episode order. In the original network run from season 2 onward, some 11-minute segments originally aired mixed with repeats; when the show was distributed internationally, the segments were combined into standardized half-hour combinations. (Season 5 had an odd number of 11-minute segments; "Never Give a Gummi an Even Break" is coupled with the season 6 segment "Friar Tum" in the "international" order.)

(The episode arrangements for the Disney Afternoon airings were completely different, with half-length segments from different seasons mixed together. These versions subsequently aired on The Disney Channel, Toon Disney, and the Family Channel in Canada.)

Season 6 premiered as part of The Disney Afternoon. The order and airdates presented here correspond to the first airings of the new episodes on TDA. Three of these were 11-minute episodes, "Friar Tum", "Zummi in Slumberland", and "A Recipe for Trouble", which each aired in the U.S. coupled with a segment from a previous season; here, each of them is listed by itself. However, in international markets, season 6 was presented in a different order than in the U.S., and these segments were grouped together into two half-hours (with "Friar Tum" being coupled with the leftover season 5 segment "Never Give a Gummi an Even Break"). This is why some episode guides list "Friar Tum/Never Give a Gummi an Even Break" and "Zummi in Slumberland/A Recipe for Trouble", which is how the episodes were presented internationally. (Also, though most consider the two-part "King Igthorn" story to be the series finale, and it comes last in the international episode order, six more episodes premiered after it in the U.S., over a two-week period in February 1991.)

Two numbers are given for each episode: One number corresponding to the order in which it premiered in the U.S., and a second corresponding to Disney's official "international" order (with the 11-minute segments marked "a" or "b" to denote the first or second segment).

Season 1: 1985

Season 2: 1986

Season 3: 1987

Season 4: 1988

Season 5: 1989–90

Season 6: 1990–91

References
Bill Cotter, The Wonderful World of Disney Television: Supplemental Material, available on CD-ROM from the author

Lists of American children's animated television series episodes
Lists of Disney Channel television series episodes